Falls Run is a tributary of Black Creek in Columbia County and Luzerne County, in Pennsylvania, in the United States. The watershed of the stream has an area of at least . The stream was historically used as a water supply and one bridge crosses it. It is in the vicinity of Buck Mountain.

Course
Falls Run begins in a valley on Buck Mountain in Beaver Township, Columbia County. It flows east for more than a mile in the valley before exiting Beaver Township and Columbia County.

Upon exiting Columbia County, Falls Run enters Black Creek Township, Luzerne County and continues flowing east. After several tenths of a mile, the stream turns northeast, leaving the mountain and entering the community of Rock Glen. It then turns north, leaving Rock Glen and flowing alongside Black Creek. Several tenths of a mile further downstream, it reaches its confluence with Black Creek.

Geography and geology

The mouth of Falls Run is located near Buck Mountain and a hill known as Middle Hill. Part of the stream is situated to the west of a gorge known as the Black Creek Gorge.

An area in the vicinity of Falls Run may overlay the a coal bed known as the Buck Mountain Bed. However, an 1895 book noted that it had not been demonstrated that this was the case.

Watershed
The watershed of Falls Run has an area of at least . Falls Run is entirely within the United States Geological Survey quadrangle of Nuremberg.

Falls Run is one of eleven officially named streams in the watershed of Nescopeck Creek that has not been assessed by the Pennsylvania Fish and Boat Commission.

History
Falls Run was entered into the Geographic Names Information System on January 1, 1990. Its identifier in the Geographic Names Information System is 1202216. It was added because it appeared in the Atlas of the Anthracite Coalfields of Pennsylvania, which was published in 1888. In the early 1800s, the portion of the stream that flowed through Luzerne County was in Sugarloaf Township, not Black Creek Township.

In the early 1900s, Falls Run was used as a water supply for the village of Rock Glen, a mining community that had a population of approximately 300 people at the time. The water supply was at one point owned by the Tomhicken Water Company before later being owned by the Wyoming Water Company. It was used as a domestic water supply in Rock Glen. The Pennsylvania Railroad also used the stream as a water supply. The water was supplied to it via gravity.

A stone arch bridge over Falls Run was proposed as early as 1906. It was to be on the road from Rock Glen to Conyngham and would have cost $550. A concrete slab bridge carrying T-309/Park Street was constructed across Falls Run in 1936.

See also
Barnes Run, next tributary of Black Creek going downstream
Stony Creek (Black Creek), next tributary of Black Creek going upstream
List of rivers of Pennsylvania

References

External links
Google Street View image of Falls Run

Rivers of Columbia County, Pennsylvania
Rivers of Luzerne County, Pennsylvania
Tributaries of Nescopeck Creek
Rivers of Pennsylvania